Engin Korukır (born 19 January 1958) is a Turkish football manager.

References

1958 births
Living people
Turkish football managers
Kocaelispor managers
Sarıyer S.K. managers
Mersin İdman Yurdu managers
Giresunspor managers
Sakaryaspor managers
Diyarbakırspor managers
Kartalspor managers
Çaykur Rizespor managers
Boluspor managers
Antalyaspor managers
Samsunspor managers